All Over You...Too is the second compilation album volume of the 1990s reformation of the progressive rock band Caravan released in 2000.

Track listing

"Hoedown" (Pye Hastings) – 4:08
"A Very Smelly Grubby Little Oik" (Hastings) –	3:28
"Bobbing Wide" (Hastings) – 3:01
"The Dog, the Dog, He's at It Again [1999 version]" (Hastings) – 6:01
"Stuck in a Hole" [1999 version] (Hastings) – 3:57
"Ride" [1999 version] (Richard Coughlan, Hastings, Richard Sinclair, Dave Sinclair) – 7:27
"Nightmare" (Hastings) – 7:00
"C'thlu Thlu" (Hastings) – 7:03
"Bobbing Wide (Reprise)" (Hastings) – 4:22

Personnel
 Pye Hastings – vocals, guitar, rhythm guitar, bass, harmony
 Doug Boyle – guitar
 Jimmy Hastings – woodwind
 Geoffrey Richardson – cello, viola
 Dave Sinclair – keyboards
 Hugh Hopper – bass, bass guitar
 Jim Leverton – bass, bass guitar
 Richard Coughlan – drums

Release information

References

External links
 
  
 Caravan - All Over You...Too (2000) album review by Lindsay Planer, credits & releases at AllMusic.com
 Caravan - All Over You...Too album releases & credits at Discogs.com
 Caravan - All Over You...Too (2000) album credits & user reviews at ProgArchives.com
 Caravan - All Over You...Too (2000) album to be listened as stream at Play.Spotify.com

Caravan (band) compilation albums
2000 compilation albums